Khanka is a city in the Qalyubiyya Governorate, Egypt. The city lies north of Cairo. Its population was estimated at about 78,000 people in 2018. The name of the city comes from a Persian word meaning "monastery, convent" ("xânqâh").

References 

Populated places in Qalyubiyya Governorate